These 141 species belong to the genus Diolcogaster, braconid wasps.

Diolcogaster species

 Diolcogaster abdominalis (Nees, 1834)
 Diolcogaster abengouroui (Risbec, 1951)
 Diolcogaster adiastola Saeed, Austin & Dangerfield, 1999
 Diolcogaster agama (de Saeger, 1944)
 Diolcogaster alce (Nixon, 1965)
 Diolcogaster alkingara Saeed, Austin & Dangerfield, 1999
 Diolcogaster alvearia (Fabricius, 1798)
 Diolcogaster ambositrensis (Granger, 1949)
 Diolcogaster anandra (de Saeger, 1944)
 Diolcogaster andamanensis Gupta & Fernandez-Triana, 2015
 Diolcogaster annulata (Granger, 1949)
 Diolcogaster anoma (Viereck, 1913)
 Diolcogaster ashmeadi Saeed, Austin & Dangerfield, 1999
 Diolcogaster aurangabadensis Fernandez-Triana, 2019
 Diolcogaster auripes (Provancher, 1886)
 Diolcogaster austrina (Wilkinson, 1929)
 Diolcogaster bakeri (Muesebeck, 1922)
 Diolcogaster bambeyi (Risbec, 1951)
 Diolcogaster basimacula (Cameron, 1905)
 Diolcogaster belokobylskiji Kotenko, 2007
 Diolcogaster bicolorina (Shenefelt, 1973)
 Diolcogaster bifurcifossa Zeng & Chen, 2011
 Diolcogaster brevicaudus (Provancher, 1886)
 Diolcogaster breviterebrus (Rao & Chalikwar, 1970)
 Diolcogaster brevivena Zeng & Chen, 2011
 Diolcogaster cariniger (Granger, 1949)
 Diolcogaster chaoi (Luo & You, 2003)
 Diolcogaster cincticornis (de Saeger, 1944)
 Diolcogaster cingulata (Granger, 1949)
 Diolcogaster claritibia (Papp, 1959)
 Diolcogaster coenonymphae (Watanabe, 1937)
 Diolcogaster connexa (Nees, 1834)
 Diolcogaster coronata (de Saeger, 1944)
 Diolcogaster coxalis (de Saeger, 1944)
 Diolcogaster curticornis (Granger, 1949)
 Diolcogaster dichromus Saeed, Austin & Dangerfield, 1999
 Diolcogaster dipika  (Bhatnagar, 1950)
 Diolcogaster duocolor Gupta & Fernandez-Triana, 2015
 Diolcogaster duris (Nixon, 1965)
 Diolcogaster earina (Wilkinson, 1929)
 Diolcogaster eclectes (Nixon, 1965)
 Diolcogaster epectina (de Saeger, 1944)
 Diolcogaster epectinopsis (de Saeger, 1944)
 Diolcogaster erro (Nixon, 1965)
 Diolcogaster euterpe (Nixon, 1965)
 Diolcogaster facetosa (Weed, 1888)
 Diolcogaster fasciipennis (Gahan, 1918)
 Diolcogaster flammea Salgado-Neto & Fernández-Triana, 2018
 Diolcogaster flavipes (Haliday, 1834)
 Diolcogaster galazia Kotenko, 2007
 Diolcogaster garmani (Ashmead, 1900)
 Diolcogaster gefidra Kotenko, 2007
 Diolcogaster glaphyra (de Saeger, 1944)
 Diolcogaster grammata Zeng & Chen, 2011
 Diolcogaster grangeri (Shenefelt, 1973)
 Diolcogaster hadrommata Saeed, Austin & Dangerfield, 1999
 Diolcogaster harrisi Saeed, Austin & Dangerfield, 1999
 Diolcogaster heterocera (de Saeger, 1944)
 Diolcogaster hinzi (Nixon, 1965)
 Diolcogaster homocera (de Saeger, 1944)
 Diolcogaster ichiroi Fernandez-Triana, 2018
 Diolcogaster indica (Wilkinson, 1927)
 Diolcogaster ineminens Zeng & Chen, 2011
 Diolcogaster insularis (Hedqvist, 1965)
 Diolcogaster integra (Wilkinson, 1929)
 Diolcogaster ippis (Nixon, 1965)
 Diolcogaster iqbali Saeed, Austin & Dangerfield, 1999
 Diolcogaster iridescens (Cresson, 1865)
 Diolcogaster kasachstanica (Tobias, 1964)
 Diolcogaster kasparyani Kotenko, 2007
 Diolcogaster kivuana (de Saeger, 1944)
 Diolcogaster laetimedia Zeng & Chen, 2011
 Diolcogaster lelaps (Nixon, 1965)
 Diolcogaster longistria Gupta & Fernandez-Triana, 2015
 Diolcogaster lucindae Saeed, Austin & Dangerfield, 1999
 Diolcogaster malabarensis Narendran & Sheeba, 2003
 Diolcogaster masoni Saeed, Austin & Dangerfield, 1999
 Diolcogaster mayae (Shestakov, 1932)
 Diolcogaster mediosulcata (Granger, 1949)
 Diolcogaster medon (Nixon, 1965)
 Diolcogaster megaulax (de Saeger, 1944)
 Diolcogaster mellea (Nixon, 1965)
 Diolcogaster merata Saeed, Austin & Dangerfield, 1999
 Diolcogaster miamensis Fernandez-Triana, 2018
 Diolcogaster minuta (Reinhard, 1880)
 Diolcogaster muzaffari Saeed, Austin & Dangerfield, 1999
 Diolcogaster narendrani Rema & Sheeba, 2004
 Diolcogaster naumanni Saeed, Austin & Dangerfield, 1999
 Diolcogaster neglecta (de Saeger, 1944)
 Diolcogaster nephele (Nixon, 1965)
 Diolcogaster newguineaensis Saeed, Austin & Dangerfield, 1999
 Diolcogaster nigromacula (de Saeger, 1944)
 Diolcogaster nixoni Saeed, Austin & Dangerfield, 1999
 Diolcogaster notopecktos Saeed, Austin & Dangerfield, 1999
 Diolcogaster orientalis (Rao & Chalikwar, 1970)
 Diolcogaster palpicolor (de Saeger, 1944)
 Diolcogaster periander (Nixon, 1965)
 Diolcogaster perniciosa (Wilkinson, 1929)
 Diolcogaster persimilis (Wilkinson, 1929)
 Diolcogaster plecopterae (Wilkinson, 1929)
 Diolcogaster pluriminitida Zeng & Chen, 2011
 Diolcogaster plutocongoensis (Shenefelt, 1973)
 Diolcogaster praritas Zeng & Chen, 2011
 Diolcogaster procris (Fischer, 1964)
 Diolcogaster psilocnema (de Saeger, 1944)
 Diolcogaster punctata (Rao & Chalikwar, 1976)
 Diolcogaster punctatiscutum Zeng & Chen, 2011
 Diolcogaster pyrene (Nixon, 1965)
 Diolcogaster reales (Nixon, 1965)
 Diolcogaster rixosa (Wilkinson, 1929)
 Diolcogaster robertsi Saeed, Austin & Dangerfield, 1999
 Diolcogaster rufithorax (Granger, 1949)
 Diolcogaster rufula Papp, 1991
 Diolcogaster rugosicoxa (Papp, 1959)
 Diolcogaster rugulosa (Rao & Chalikwar, 1970)
 Diolcogaster schizurae (Muesebeck, 1922)
 Diolcogaster scotica (Marshall, 1885)
 Diolcogaster semirufa (de Saeger, 1944)
 Diolcogaster seriphus (Nixon, 1965)
 Diolcogaster seyrigi (Granger, 1949)
 Diolcogaster solitaria Gupta & Fernandez-Triana, 2015
 Diolcogaster sons (Wilkinson, 1932)
 Diolcogaster spreta (Marshall, 1885)
 Diolcogaster stepposa (Tobias, 1964)
 Diolcogaster subtorquata (Granger, 1949)
 Diolcogaster sulcata (de Saeger, 1944)
 Diolcogaster tearae (Wilkinson, 1929)
 Diolcogaster tegularia (Papp, 1959)
 Diolcogaster tomentosae (Wilkinson, 1930)
 Diolcogaster torquatiger (Granger, 1949)
 Diolcogaster translucida Zeng & Chen, 2011
 Diolcogaster tristiculus (Granger, 1949)
 Diolcogaster tropicalus Saeed, Austin & Dangerfield, 1999
 Diolcogaster turneri (Wilkinson, 1929)
 Diolcogaster urios (Nixon, 1965)
 Diolcogaster vulcana (de Saeger, 1944)
 Diolcogaster vulpina (Wilkinson, 1929)
 Diolcogaster walkerae Saeed, Austin & Dangerfield, 1999
 Diolcogaster wittei (de Saeger, 1944)
 Diolcogaster xanthaspis (Ashmead, 1900)
 Diolcogaster yousufi Saeed, Austin & Dangerfield, 1999

References

Diolcogaster